Jean-Claude Fruteau (6 June 1947 – 28 April 2022) was a French politician and a Member of the European Parliament for France's "outre mer" from 1999 to 2007. He was a member of the Socialist Party, which was part of the Party of European Socialists, and was vice-chair of the European Parliament's Committee on Agriculture and Rural Development.

He was also a substitute for the Committee on the Internal Market and Consumer Protection and a substitute for the delegation to the ACP-EU Joint Parliamentary Assembly.

Career
 Highest postgraduate teaching qualification in language and literature (1972)
 Teacher in higher education, with the highest postgraduate teaching qualification
 First federal secretary, Réunion Socialist Party (1981–2000)
 Mayor of Saint-Benoît (Réunion) (1983–1999)
 Member of the Réunion Departmental Council (since 1982)
 Member of the European Parliament (1999–2007)
 Member of the French Parliament (2007–2017)

References

External links
 Official website (in French)
 European Parliament biography
 Declaration of financial interests (in French; PDF file)

1947 births
2022 deaths
Réunionnais socialists
MEPs for the Overseas Territories of France 2004–2009
Socialist Party (France) MEPs
MEPs for France 1999–2004
MEPs for France 2004–2009
Mayors of places in Réunion
Deputies of the 13th National Assembly of the French Fifth Republic
Deputies of the 14th National Assembly of the French Fifth Republic
Members of the Regional Council of Réunion
Members of Parliament for Réunion